Bal Vidyamandir High School (abbreviated as BVM) is a high school in Parbhani, Maharashtra, India. The school has two branches in Parbhani city - Nanal Peth branch and Vaibhav Nagar branch. Both the schools are affiliated to Maharashtra State Board of Secondary and Higher Secondary Education. Nanal Peth branch imparts education from I to Class XII (10+2).

Academics
The school follows the scheme of SSC up to Class X. In Class XI and Class XII, the institute offers three 3-subject streams:

Science
Physics, Chemistry, Mathematics/Biology, Hindi/Computer Science, English and Commercial Arts

Commerce
Mathematics/Hindi/Computer Science, Economics, Accounts, Business Studies, English and Physical Education

References

High schools and secondary schools in Maharashtra
Parbhani district